The major drug laws of India are the Narcotic Drugs and Psychotropic Substances Act (1985) and the Prevention of Illicit Trafficking in Narcotic Drugs and Psychotropic Substances Act (1988).

Legal Background

Narcotic Drugs and Psychotropic Substances Act 

The Narcotic Drugs and Psychotropic Substances Act of 1985 was introduced in the Lok Sabha on 23 August 1985. It was passed by both the Houses of Parliament and it was assented by the President on 16 September 1985. It came into force on 14 November 1985 as THE NARCOTIC DRUGS AND PSYCHOTROPIC SUBSTANCES ACT, 1985 (shortened to NDPS Act). Under the NDPS Act, it is illegal for a person to produce/manufacture/cultivate, possess, sell, purchase, transport, store, and/or consume any narcotic drug or psychotropic substance.

Under one of the provisions of the act, the Narcotics Control Bureau was set up with effect from March 1986. The Act is designed to fulfill India's treaty obligations under the Single Convention on Narcotic Drugs, Convention on Psychotropic Substances, and United Nations Convention Against Illicit Traffic in Narcotic Drugs and Psychotropic Substances. The Act has been amended three times - in 1988, 2001, and most recently in 2014.

The 2014 Amendment recognizes the need for pain relief as an important obligation of the government. It creates a class of medicines called Essential Narcotic Drugs (ENDs). Power for legislation on ENDs has been shifted from the state governments to the central governments so that the whole country now can have a uniform law covering these medicines which are needed for pain relief.

Subsequently, NDPS rules which would be applicable to all states and union territories has been announced by the government of India in May 2015. It also has included 6 drugs namely Morphine, Fentanyl, Methadone, Oxycodone, Codeine and Hydrocodone. According to these rules, there is a single agency - the state drug controller - who can approve recognised medical institutions (RMI) for stocking and dispensing ENDs, without the need for any other licences. The RMIs are obliged to ensure proper documentation and to submit annual consumption statistics to the drug controller of the state.

The Act extends to the whole of India and it applies also to all Indian citizens outside India and to all persons on ships and aircraft registered in India.

A proposal to amend the NDPS Act via a Private Member's Bill was announced by Dr. Dharamvira Gandhi MP in November 2016. Dr. Gandhi's bill would legalise marijuana and opium.

Prevention of Illicit Trafficking in Narcotic Drugs and Psychotropic Substances Act 
The Prevention of Illicit Trafficking in Narcotic Drugs and Psychotropic Substances Act is a drug control law passed in 1988 by the Parliament of India. It was established to enable the full implementation and enforcement of the Narcotic Drugs and Psychotropic Substances Act of 1985.

Narcotics Control Bureau 

The Narcotics Control Bureau (NCB) is the chief law enforcement and intelligence agency of India responsible for fighting drug trafficking and the abuse of illegal substances. It was created on 17 March 1986 to enable the full implementation of the Narcotic Drugs and Psychotropic Substances Act (1985) and fight its violation through the Prevention of Illicit Trafficking in Narcotic Drugs and Psychotropic Substances Act (1988).

Punishment
Anyone who contravenes the NDPS Act will face punishment based on the quantity of the banned substance. 
where the contravention involves small quantity(<1 kg), with rigorous imprisonment for a term which may extend to 6 months, or with fine which may extend to 10,000 or with both;
where the contravention involves quantity lesser than commercial quantity but greater than small quantity, with rigorous imprisonment for a term which may extend to 10 years and with fine which may extend to 1 lakh;
where the contravention involves commercial quantity, with rigorous imprisonment for a term which shall not be less than 10 years but which may extend to 20 years and shall also be liable to fine which shall not be less than 1 lakh but which may extend to 2 lakh.

Controlled substances 
The following list mentions the names of all substances banned or controlled in India under the NDPS Act. The list uses the International Nonproprietary Name (INN) of the drugs but in some cases mentions drugs by their chemical name. Widely known drugs such as ganja, cocaine, heroin etc. are mentioned by those names.

Cultivation/production/manufacture, possession, sale, purchase, transport, storage, consumption or distribution of
any of the following substances, except for medical and scientific purposes and as per the rules or orders and conditions of licences that may be issued, is illegal.

List of controlled substances 

Acetorphine
Acetyl-alpha-methylfentanyl
Acetyldihydrocodeine
Acetylmethadol
Alfentanil
Allobarbital
Allylprodine
Alpha-Methyl-4-methylthiophenethylamine
Alphacetylmethadol
Alphameprodine
Alphamethadol
Alpha-methylfentanyl
Alpha-methylthiofentanyl
Alphaprodine
Alprazolam
Amfepramone
Aminorex
Amobarbital
Anileridine
Benzethidine
Benzyl morphine
Betacetylmethadol
Beta-hydroxyfentanyl
Beta-hydroxy-3-methylfentanyl
Betameprodine
Betamethadol
Betaprodine
Bezitramide
Cannabis and cannabis resin (includes Hashish and Charas)
Clonitazene
Coca derivatives
Coca leaf
Cocaine
Codeine
Codoxime
Concentrate of poppy straw
Desomorphine
Dextromoramide
Dextropropoxyphene
Diampromide
Diethylthiambutene
Difenoxin
Dihydrocodeine
Dihydromorphine
Dihydroxydihydromorphinone
Dimenoxadol
Dimepheptanol
Dimethylthiambutene
Dioxaphetyl butyrate
Diphenoxylate
Dipipanone
Drotebanol
Ecgonine
Ethylmethylthiambutene
Ethylmorphine
Etonitazene
Etorphine
Etoxeridine
Fentanyl
Furethidine
Ganja
Heroin
Hydrocodone
Hydromorphinol
Hydromorphone
Hydroxypethidine
Isomethadone
Ketobemidone
Levomethorphan
Levomoramide
Levophenacylmorphan
Levorphanol
Metazocine
Methadone
Methadone intermediate
Methyldihydromorphine
Methyldihydromorphine
3-Methylfentanyl
3-Methylthiofentanyl
Metopon
Moramide intermediate
Morpheridine
Morphine
Morphine methobromide
Morphine-N-oxide
MPPP
Myrophine
N-cyclopropyl methyl-7,8-dihydro-7-(1-hydroxy-1 methyl-ethyl) O-methyl-6,14-endoethanonormorphine
Nicocodine
Nicodicodine
Nicomorphine
Noracymethadol
Norcodeine
Norlevorphanol
Normethadone
Normorphine
Norpipanone
Opium
Opium derivatives
Oxycodone
Oxymorphone
Para-fluorofentanyl
PEPAP
Pethidine
Pethidine intermediate A
Pethidine intermediate B
Pethidine intermediate C
Phenadoxone
Phenampromide
Phenazocine
Phenomorphan
Phenoperidine
Pholcodine
Piminodine
Piritramide
Poppy straw
Preparations made from the extract or tincture of Indian hemp
Proheptazine
Properidine
Propiram
Racemethorphan
Racemoramide
Racemorphan
Sufentanil
Thebacon
Thebaine
Thiofentanyl
Tilidine
Tobacco
Trimeperidine
Brolamfetamine
Cathinone
3-[2-(diethylamino)ethyl]indole (N,N-Diethyltryptamine)
(+)-2,5-dimethoxy-alpha-methylphenethylamine
3-(1,2-dimethylheptyl)-7,8,9,10-tetrahydro-6,6,9-trimethyl-6H-dibenzo(b,d)pyran-1-ol
3-[2-(dimethylamino) ethyl] indole (N,N-Dimethyltryptamine)
(+)-4-ethyl-1,5-dimethoxy-alpha-phenethylamine
Eticyclidine
Etryptamine
(+)-Lysergide
(+)-N,alpha-dimethyl-3,4-(methylenedioxy)phenethylamine
3,4,5-trimethoxyphenethylamine
Methcathinone
(+)-cis-2-amino-4-methyl-5-phenyl-2-oxazoline
2-methoxy-alpha-methyl-4,5-phenethylamine
(±)-N-ethyl-alpha-methyl-3,4-(methylenedioxy)phenethylamine
(±)-N-(alpha-methyl-3,4-(methylenedioxy)phenethyl) hydroxylamine
3-hexy-7,8,9,10-tetrahydro-6,6,9-trimethyl-6H-dibenzo(b,d)pyran-1-ol
p-methoxy-alpha-methylphenethylamine
3-(2-(dimethylamino)ethyl)indol-4-ol
Psilocybine
Rolicyclidine
2,5-dimethoxy-alpha,4-dimethylphenethylamine
Tenamfetamine
Tenocyclidine
(+)-3,4,5-trimethoxy-alpha-methyphenethylamine
4-bromo-2,5-dimethoxyphen Dexamfetamine
Fenetylline
Levamfetamine
(x)-N,alpha-dimethylphenethylamine
Mecloqualone
Metamfetamine
Metamfetamine (racemate)
Methaqualone
Methylphenidate
Phencyclidine
Phenmetrazine
Secobarbital
Dronabinol
Zipeprol
Buprenorphine
Butalbital
Cathine
Cyclobarbital
Flunitrazepam
Glutethimide
Pentazocine
Pentobarbital
Benzfetamine
Bromazepam
5-butyl-5ric acid
Brotizolam
Camazepam
Chlordiazepoxide
Clobazam
Clonazepam
Clorazepate
Clotiazepam
Cloxazolam
Delorazepam
Diazepam
Estazolam
Ethchlorvynol
Ethinamate
Ethylloflazepate
Etilamfetamine
Fencamfamin
Fenproporex
Fludiazepam
Flurazepam
gamma-Hydroxybutyric acid
Halazepam
Haloxazolam
Ketazolam
Lefetamine
Loprazolam
Lorazepam
Lormetazepam
Mazindol
Medazepam
Mefenorex
Meprobamate
Mesocarb
Methylphenobarbital
Methyprylon
Midazolam
Nimetazepam
Nitrazepam
Nordazepam
Oxazepam
Oxazolam
Pemoline
Phendimetrazine
Phenobarbital
Phentermine
Pinazepam
Pipradrol
Prazepam
Pyrovalerone
Secbutabarbital
Temazepam
Tetrazepam
Triazolam
Vinylbital
Zolpidem
Ketamine
Tramadol

Any mixture or preparation that of with or without a neutral material, of any of the above drugs.
The following isomers and their stereochemical variants:
 7,8,9,10-tetrahydro-6,6,9-trimethyl-3-pentyl-6H-dibenzo[b,d]pyran-1-ol (9R,10aR)-8,9,10,10a-trtrahydro-6,6,9-trimethyl-3-pentyl-6H-dibenzo[b,d]pyan-1-ol
 (6aR,9R,10aR)-6a,9,10,10-a- tetrahydro-6,6,9-tremthyl-3-penthyl-6H-dibenzo[b,d]pyran-1-ol
 (6aR,10aR)-6a,7,10,10a- tetrahydro-6,6,9-tremthyl-3-penthyl-6H-dibenzo[b,d]pyran-1-ol
 6a,7,8,9-tetrahydro-6,6,9-trimethyl-3-pentyl-6h-dibenzo[b,d]pyran-1-ol
 (6aR,10aR)-6a,7,8,9,10,10a-hexahydro-6, 6-dimethyl-9-methylene 3-pentyl-6H-dibenxo[b,d]pyran-1-ol

Source: Narcotics Control Bureau

See also
 Legal opium production in India
 Cannabis in India
 Bhang
 Schedule X
 Schedule H
Temperance movement in India

References

External links
Homepage of Narcotics Control Bureau
 Homepage of Central Bureau of Narcotics

 
Acts of the Parliament of India
Policies of India
1985 in law
1985 in India
1988 in law
1988 in India